Emilie Kornheiser is an American politician who serves as a member of the Vermont House of Representatives from the Windham district as an member of the Democratic Party.

Early life and education

Emilie Kornheiser was born in Louisville, Kentucky, and was raised in New York. She graduated with a Bachelor of Arts degree in sociology from Marlboro College. She married John, with whom she has one child. She was appointed to the Vermont Commission on Women by Speaker Mitzi Johnson in 2017.

Vermont House of Representatives

Kornheiser defeated Valerie Stuart, a member of the Vermont House of Representatives who had not faced opposition during her tenure, in the 2018 primary and won without opposition in the general election. She defeated Republican nominee Richard Morton in the 2020 election. She serves on the Government Accountability committee and as vice-chair of the Ways and Means committee.

Kornheiser is a sponsor of right to repair legislation.

Electoral history

References

21st-century American politicians
21st-century American women politicians
Living people
Marlboro College alumni
Democratic Party members of the Vermont House of Representatives
Women state legislators in Vermont
Year of birth missing (living people)